was an athletic stadium located in the city of Yamagata, Yamagata Prefecture  Japan.

The stadium was home to the NEC Yamagata soccer team (now Montedio Yamagata) of the Japan Football League until 1995, when the team was relocated to ND Soft Stadium Yamagata. After renovation, the stadium was a multi-purpose venue with a cinder track and a central pitch of 108 x 71 meters. It was one of the home stadium of football club Montedio Yamagata from 1999 to 2001.

References

External links
Yamagata City Amateur Sports Association

Football venues in Japan
Sports venues in Yamagata Prefecture
Yamagata, Yamagata
Sports venues completed in 1979
1979 establishments in Japan